The Babylon Game is a fantasy novel by British writer Katherine Roberts, the second book in The Seven Fabulous Wonders series and the sequel to The Great Pyramid Robbery.

Plot summary

It is the year 539 BC; inside the city of Babylon, known as the Gateway of God, is Tia, the adopted daughter of a perfume maker. She is picking herbs in the sacred Amytis garden. Next to the garden is a portion of the double defense wall surrounding the city. Tia soon discovered what is between the two walls; Sirrush, otherwise known as dragons.

Fearing for the dragon's health, she leaves them food. A touch from the dragons grants Tia great magical powers, enough to threaten or save Babylon. These will be needed, as far in the plains the Persian king Cyrus the Great, plans to capture Babylon. The secret of its salvation might just lie in the hanging gardens themselves.

2002 British novels
British fantasy novels
Novels by Katherine Roberts
Voyager Books books
539 BC
Novels set in ancient Persia
Novels set in the 6th century BC